Lost Canyon is a 1942 American Western film directed by Lesley Selander and written by Harry O. Hoyt. The film stars William Boyd, Andy Clyde, Jay Kirby, Lola Lane, Douglas Fowley and Herbert Rawlinson, is a remake of Rustlers' Valley (1937). The film was released on December 18, 1942, by United Artists.

Plot

Cast 
 William Boyd as Hopalong Cassidy
 Andy Clyde as California Carlson
 Jay Kirby as Johnny Travers
 Lola Lane as Laura Clark
 Douglas Fowley as Jeff Burton 
 Herbert Rawlinson as Tom Clark
 Guy Usher as Zack Rogers, Banker
 Karl Hackett as Foreman Haskell
 Hugh Prosser as Sheriff Jim Stanton
 Bob Kortman as Joe, Burton Henchman
 The Sportsmen Quartet as Singing Cowhands 
 Bill Days as Singing Ranch Hand 
 John Rarig as Singing Ranch Hand 
 Thurl Ravenscroft as Tall Bass-Singing Ranch Hand 
 Max Smith as Singing Ranch Hand

References

External links 
 
 
 
 

1942 films
American black-and-white films
1940s English-language films
Films directed by Lesley Selander
United Artists films
American Western (genre) films
1942 Western (genre) films
Hopalong Cassidy films
Films scored by Paul Sawtell
1940s American films